Philipp Naruhn (born 14 July 1983 in Schwerin) is a German rower.

References 
 
 

1983 births
Living people
Sportspeople from Schwerin
Olympic rowers of Germany
Rowers at the 2008 Summer Olympics
World Rowing Championships medalists for Germany
German male rowers